The Landfair Apartments is a historic two-building multi-family complex located on the southwest corner of Landfair Avenue and Ophir Drive in the Westwood neighborhood of Los Angeles, California. They were colloquially known as The Glass House and was renamed Robison Hall after UCHA member Everett Robison was drafted and killed in action in World War II.

The building is a part of a collection of homes designed by Los Angeles based modernist architect, Richard Neutra, and built in North West Westwood Village, which includes the Strathmore Apartments, Elkay Apartments, and Kelton Apartments. Architectural historians Robert Winter and David Gebhard has said that the Landfair Apartments is Neutra's "most International Style designs...of the 1930s."

History 
It was designed in 1937 by Neutra in the International style. It originally consisted of five townhouses and two apartments and was purchased in 1941 by the University Cooperative Housing Association. The balconies and exterior glazing were removed when the building was converted to dormitory-style living. It has been altered to meet seismic and accessibility standards. One unit was left unchanged to document Neutra's original townhouse design.

On May 20, 1987, the City of Los Angeles designated the building as a Los Angeles Historic-Cultural Monument.

See also
List of Los Angeles Historic-Cultural Monuments on the Westside

References

Richard Neutra buildings
Apartment buildings in Los Angeles
Residential buildings completed in 1937
Los Angeles Historic-Cultural Monuments
Westwood, Los Angeles
International style architecture in California
Modernist architecture in California